George England (1812–1885) was an English businessman.

George England may also refer to:

George England (divine), English divine and author
George England (organ builder), English organ builder
George Pike England (1765–1816), his son, organ builder
George Allan England (1877–1937), American writer and explorer
George England and Co. English locomotive manufacturing company

See also